David Bullock (born November 13, 1960), known as The .38 Caliber Killer, is an American serial killer who killed at least six people in New York City between December 1981 and January 1982. Owing to his unassuming appearance and character, his killing spree was undetected by local police for some time, who were unaware that a serial murderer was operating in the area.

Despite the fact that Bullock committed the murders four years after David Berkowitz's notorious crime spree, which caused a moral panic in the city, the former's killings were not widely reported and failed to acquire international renown, since most of the details became known after his arrest.

Early life 
David Bullock was born on November 13, 1960, in New York City. Both of his parents were dependent on alcohol, which resulted in Bullock's grandfather raising him. He attended school for some time, but after his first arrest in February 1977 and subsequent imprisonment, he was expelled and never returned.

Criminal career 
Bullock was first arrested in February 1977 in Monroe, New York, for theft. Five months later, he committed a similar crime in Manhattan, was caught, pled guilty, was convicted, and spent several months in a juvenile institution. He was released in November of that same year, but two months later, Bullock was arrested in Goshen, New York, for burglary. After his release, he permanently moved to Manhattan, where, having no source of income, Bullock engaged in male prostitution to survive. Between the period of 1978 and 1981, he was prosecuted an additional five times.

Arrest and exposure 
Bullock was arrested on January 14, 1982, in the basement of an apartment building as a witness in the disappearance of his roommate Michael Winley. During the search, a .38 caliber revolver and a shotgun were seized. A few hours after his detainment, Bullock confessed to authorities that he had committed six murders. The first victim was 42-year-old teacher and theatrical actor James Weber, whose body was discovered on December 5, 1981, in Central Park, hours after Weber's performance as the father in a production of Babes in Toyland at the Light Opera of Manhattan. After shooting Weber, Bullock stole his money and ID, which delayed the victim's identification by a few days. The reasons for Weber's appearance late at night in the park were never established, with police suggesting that the deceased and his killer were familiar and in a homosexual relationship. This theory was rejected by Weber's relatives and acquaintances, while Bullock himself denied dating James. According to him, he had gone to the park to shoot birds when he came across Weber, deciding to kill him at random.

A few days later, Bullock killed his 23-year-old friend, prostitute Edwina Atkins. According to Bullock, it was a crime of hatred: he had told her about killing Weber, but in response, she laughed in his face in disbelief. After shooting Atkins, he set fire to the apartment in order to destroy any evidence of a crime. His next confessed victim was 29-year-old investment consultant Stephen Glenn Hassell, who was promised sexual services in exchange for money. He lured Hassell to his luxurious Manhattan apartment where, during the late night of December 15, Bullock shot him after covering his face with a pillow. Although Hassell was an influential person and the murder occurring in a prestigious area of the city, Bullock managed to leave the crime scene unnoticed, leaving no evidence or clues for the investigators.

Bullock's fourth victim was 50-year-old Heriberto Morales, a gay man whom Bullock had known since 1980. On the evening of December 22, Bullock recalled that he and Morales were at a Christmas party, after which they went to Heriberto's apartment. According to him, the victim started messing with a Christmas tree and telling how nice it is, whereupon he was shot to death. Bullock then stole some jewelry and other valuables and, as with Atkins' killing, set fire to the apartment before leaving. The serial killer's last victim was 28-year-old security guard Eric Michael Fuller, whom Bullock shot on January 4, 1982, with a shotgun during a robbery.

Subsequently, Bullock admitted that he was responsible for his roommate's disappearance: according to his claims, he shot Winley on December 23 and threw his corpse into the Harlem River. Police organized a search to collect the body but were unsuccessful. After examining the five murder scenes, ballistic experts concluded that the same .38 caliber revolver, which belonged to Bullock, had been used to kill the victims.

Trial and imprisonment 
David Bullock's trial began in the fall of 1982, a high-profile case for its time. He was sent to be mentally evaluated, with psychiatrists determining that he had no underlying mental illnesses or abnormalities, but acknowledged that the defendant had an impaired emotional state. He was charged with six murders, even though Winley's body was never located. At the court hearings, Bullock appeared to be in a positive mood, describing in detail the crimes he had committed in a sarcastic and extremely cynical tone, without expressing any visible remorse. On October 26, 1982, he pleaded guilty to all charges, naming hedonism as his main motive, stating the following: "I was in the Christmas spirit. It made me happy. I enjoy what I do". Three days later, he was sentenced to 150 years imprisonment. At the time, such long sentences were unprecedented in the state's history.

Aftermath 
As of May 2020, the 59-year-old Bullock is alive and serving his sentence at the Clinton Correctional Facility. Over the past 38 years in prison, the media has lost interest in his crimes, and the circumstances behind his life in jail are unknown.

See also
 List of serial killers in the United States

References

External links
 Gay History Wiki article on Bullock
 Courtroom sketch of David Bullock by Ida Dengrove
 NYS Department of Corrections Inmate Search

1960 births
20th-century American criminals
American male criminals
American people convicted of burglary
American people convicted of murder
American people convicted of theft
American serial killers
Criminals from New York City
Living people
Male serial killers
People convicted of murder by New York (state)
Prisoners sentenced to life imprisonment by New York (state)